Pulozero is a rural locality (a selo) in Pushnovsky Territorial Okrug of Kolsky District of Murmansk Oblast, Russia, located on the Kola Peninsula beyond the Arctic Circle at a height of  above sea level. Population: 7 (2010 Census).

History
Pulozero, then a pogost, served as the administrative center of Pulozersky Selsoviet, which was established within Kolsko-Loparskaya Volost of Alexandrovsky Uyezd of Arkhangelsk Governorate by the Resolution of Kolsko-Loparskaya Volost Executive Committee on August 26, 1921 (which came into effect in the first half of 1922) on the territory split off from Yekostrovsky Selsoviet.

References

Notes

Sources

Rural localities in Murmansk Oblast
